Kathryn O'Reilly is a British actress and playwright.

Early life
She began acting in local youth theatre in Surrey before going to the National Youth Theatre of Great Britain, she also trained at BRIT Performing Arts School, attended Anna Scher and Ken Campbell classes and completed her classical training at the London Academy of Music and Dramatic Art (LAMDA) in 2008 where she won the original poetry writing competition two years consecutively; in 2007 with her poem Him and Me and in 2008 with Klink Klank Echoes that she performed with fellow class mate Gary Carr.

It was during her first year of training at LAMDA that she landed the role of Penny Collins in The Bill and in the second year she started filming on the award winning feature film Zebra Crossing directed by Sam Holland.

Career
Kathryn graduated from LAMDA with a Bachelor of Arts hons in 2008. During her training, Kathryn acted in many productions at LAMDA; Breaking Barriers In Burnley, Twelfth Night, Blue Remembered Hills
and also director showcases; After The Accident directed by Edwina Casey, Peter Pan and Desdemona a play about a Handkerchief.

Kathryn's theatre work includes work with leading touring theatre company Out Of Joint. Kathryn O'Reilly gave over 318 performances playing Liz Morden in Timberlake Wertenbaker's Oliver award winning play Our Country's Good and received rave reviews. "Kathryn O'Reilly is hugely impressive as the flinty thief who ultimately saves her neck by discovering her voice" - Michael Billington, The Guardian

"Kathryn O'Reilly gives a brilliantly sparky and furious performance as one of the most disaffected prisoners, Liz Morden, who faces the gallows" 
- Charles Spencer, The Telegraph

"Kathryn O'Reilly prize worthy performance as Liz Morden" - TC Daily Planet Guthrie Theatre, Minneapolis

Theatre
Theatre includes; for Out of Joint; Close Quarters (Sheffield Crucible), A View From Islington North (Arts Theatre, Leicester Square), Liz Morden / Will Dawes for Out of Joint 2014 international tour and 2012/13 tour of Our Country's Good (St James Theatre), Andersen's English (Hampstead Theatre) & Mixed Up North (Wilton's Music Hall).
YOU by Mark Wilson, directed by Sarah Meadows, starring Stephen Myott-Meadows & Kathryn O'Reilly (Show of the Week Winners at Vault Festival)
YOU (Argus Angel Winners at Brighton Fringe Festival)
Arms and the Man directed by Brigid Larmour (Watford Palace Theatre)
Caught by Christopher Chen nominated for an Offie directed by Cressida Brown (Arcola Theatre)
hamlet is dead. no gravity (Arcola Theatre)
The Golden Dragon (Plymouth theatre Royal)
Love on the Tracks (Soho Theatre Studio & Redbridge Drama Centre)
A Christmas Carol (Trafalgar Studios), Oedipus (Sheffield Crucible)
Rift (Brewhouse Theatre) was granted the prestigious Inspire mark by the London 2012 Inspire programme.

Television
 Grantchester
 Call The Midwife
 Holby City
 The Watcher
 Lewis V
 The Bill
 Rough Justice
 Doctors

Film
includes; 
Rare Beasts written, starring and directed by Billie Piper 
The Little Stranger (Potboiler Films) directed by Lenny Abrahamson
Zebra Crossing (Crown Films; winner of Raindance award; Socal California, Radar Hamberg film festival); 
Cold Calling (Woolfcub films, winner of indi short film comp 2008); 
Los Jack Machine (Free Seed Films, winner Best Shorts awards winner, nominated for outstanding cast performanceAOF International film festival), 
Klink Klank (DameTK Productions); 
RANDOM (Channel 4 & Hillbilly Films, winner of BAFTA 2012 best single drama).

Playwriting
Kathryn's second play Poisoned Polluted premiered at Old Red Lion Theatre in 2019 and is published by Nick Hern Books. She starred in this along with Anna Doolan, both actresses have been nominated an Offie for Best Female Performance on a Play.

Kathryn's debut play Screwed, directed by Sarah Meadows who was nominated an Offie for Best Director premiered at Theatre503 June - July 2016 and is published by Nick Hern Books.
“A witty look at female friendship in a broken society. O’Reilly has a great ear for the scrappy rhythm of everyday speech. An assured debut, at times sharply observed and bruisingly funny” - Tom Wicker, Time Out

“Highly impressive, very authentic writing, combined with great acting made for an altogether very unpleasant and yet strangely compelling play” Terry Eastham - LondonTheatre1

“Screwed has a lusty vitality that feels both hectically excitable and, so far as it goes, emotionally truthful. With its punchy dialogue, and alcohol-inflected hilarity, Screwed has a vulgar vigour and an emotional energy that throbs like an inflamed sex organ. O’Reilly writes convincing dialogue and has added variety and pace to the storytelling by using monologues and choral passages” 
Aleks Sierz - My Theatre Mates

References

http://kathryn-oreilly.com/
https://www.imdb.com/name/nm4392927/?ref_=fn_al_nm_1
http://www.outofjoint.co.uk/c/our-countrys-good
https://www.theguardian.com/stage/2013/feb/05/our-countrys-good-review
https://www.telegraph.co.uk/culture/theatre/theatre-reviews/9850495/Our-Countrys-Good-St-James-Theatre-London-review.html
https://www.standard.co.uk/goingout/theatre/our-countrys-good-st-james--review-8494571.html
http://www.timeout.com/london/theatre/our-countrys-good
http://thefactoryline.com/kathrynoreillyissetforstardom/

Actresses from Surrey
21st-century British actresses
Year of birth missing (living people)
Alumni of the London Academy of Music and Dramatic Art
National Youth Theatre members
Living people
21st-century English women
21st-century English people